The following is a list of world backgammon champions:

See also

Computer Olympiad - Backgammon
List of world championships in mind sports

References

External links

Backgammon

Backgammon
Backgammon